The Pueblo Federal Building is a historic government building in Pueblo, Colorado, built in 1897.  The building serves as a federal courthouse and post office.  It was listed on the National Register of Historic Places in 1978.

It was designed by architect William Aiken.  It was built at cost of $275,000. "The Post Office is characteristic of many other fine government structures constructed in the late 1800s, though it is the only example of this type of architecture in the region."

References

External links

Colorado Historical Society
https://www.facebook.com/pages/Pueblo-Business-Online/528284787236492?hc_location=timeline

Federal buildings in the United States
Courthouses in Colorado
Courthouses on the National Register of Historic Places in Colorado
Government buildings completed in 1897
Italianate architecture in Colorado
Post office buildings on the National Register of Historic Places in Colorado
National Register of Historic Places in Pueblo, Colorado